Mount Pleasant is a neighbourhood of Brampton, Ontario, Canada, located in the northwestern portion of the city. Historically, the community was a rural hamlet surrounded by agricultural lands. Since opening the Mount Pleasant GO Station in 2006, the area has experienced rapid suburban growth. Along with the Mount Pleasant GO Station retail amenities have opened in the area. The public library has opened up both floors and the library building is a reconstructed historic CPR station structure used as a cultural facility in the Mount Pleasant Civic Square shared with the Peel District School Board and the library. The school connected to the library is Mount Pleasant Village Public School and offers grades K-8.

See also

 List of unincorporated communities in Ontario

External links
Mount Pleasant at Geographical Names of Canada

Neighbourhoods in Brampton